In mathematics, a Catalan pseudoprime is an odd composite number n satisfying the congruence

where Cm denotes the m-th Catalan number. The congruence also holds for every odd prime number n that justifies the name  pseudoprimes for composite numbers n satisfying it.

Properties 

The only known Catalan pseudoprimes are: 5907, 1194649, and 12327121  with the latter two being squares of Wieferich primes. In general, if p is a Wieferich prime, then p2 is a Catalan pseudoprime.

References
 
 Catalan pseudoprimes. Research in Scientific Computing in Undergraduate Education.

Pseudoprimes